Chaharduli Rural District is in Keshavarz District of Shahin Dezh County, West Azerbaijan province, Iran. At the National Census of 2006, its population was 6,353 in 1,324 households. There were 5,470 inhabitants in 1,422 households at the following census of 2011. At the most recent census of 2016, the population of the rural district was 4,986 in 1,451 households. The largest of its 36 villages was Zaher Kandi, with 664 people.

References 

Shahin Dezh County

Rural Districts of West Azerbaijan Province

Populated places in West Azerbaijan Province

Populated places in Shahin Dezh County